The Geopark Way is a waymarked long-distance trail located within the counties of Shropshire, Worcestershire, Herefordshire and Gloucestershire, England. It runs  from Bridgnorth to Gloucester.

Connecting trails

The Geopark Way links with the Worcestershire Way, Glevum Way, Gloucestershire Way, Herefordshire Trail, Jack Mytton Way, Sabrina Way, Severn Way, Shropshire Way, Three Choirs Way and the Wysis Way.

See also
Long-distance footpaths in the United Kingdom

References

External links
Abberley and Malvern Hills Geopark
Earth Heritage Trust- Geopark Way
Geopark Way - LDWA Long Distance Paths

Geoparks in England
Long-distance footpaths in England
Footpaths in Shropshire
Footpaths in Worcestershire
Footpaths in Herefordshire
Footpaths in Gloucestershire